is a former Japanese voice actress who was affiliated with 81 Produce.

Filmography

Anime
Gunslinger Girl: Il Teatrino (Rico)
Penguin Musume Heart (Hunting Maria)
Tokimeki Memorial Only Love (Tsukasa Kasuga)

Video games
Grand Chase (Elesis Sieghart)
Virtua Fighter 5 (Eileen)

Drama CD
Shiritsu Sairyou Koukou Chounouryokubu (Horii)

Miscellaneous
Tokimeki Memorial Only Love (ED song performance (with Saki Fujita and Yuki Makishima))

External links

Voice actresses from Chiba Prefecture
Japanese video game actresses
Japanese voice actresses
81 Produce voice actors
Living people
Year of birth missing (living people)
21st-century Japanese actresses